Arnold Fabián Peralta Sosa (29 March 1989 – 10 December 2015) was a Honduran footballer who played as a defensive midfielder.

He began his career at Vida in 2008, and five years later he joined Scottish club Rangers, where he won the Scottish League One in 2013–14. After being released in January 2015, he returned to his homeland with Olimpia. Peralta was a full international with 26 caps for the Honduras national football team from his debut in 2011, representing the nation at the 2012 Olympics, although he was not selected for the 2014 FIFA World Cup squad due to injury.

He was shot dead on 10 December 2015 in his hometown of La Ceiba. He was buried in Jardines de Paz Ceibeños cemetery.

Career

Club

Vida
Born in La Ceiba, Peralta began his career in 2008 with his hometown LINA club Vida.

Rangers
In June 2013, Peralta agreed to join the Scottish club Rangers on a four–year deal, subject to receiving a work permit. He was eligible to play once Rangers' player registration embargo was lifted on 1 September 2013. Peralta scored his first goal for Rangers in a friendly against Dundee. Already crowned Scottish League One champions, his first competitive goal came against Stranraer on 26 April 2014, a 3–0 win at Ibrox which saw Rangers pass 100 points in the season.

On 21 January 2015, Rangers announced that Peralta's contract had been terminated by mutual consent. He went on trial with Kazakhstan's Shakhter Karagandy, but did not earn a contract.

Olimpia
Peralta later returned to his home country after signing for Olimpia.

International
Peralta was the Honduran Under-20 captain.  He helped his country qualify for the 2009 FIFA World Youth Championship, in Egypt, in which he played three games scoring against eventual third place team from Hungary. He also participated in the 2012 Summer Olympics, making his debut on 26 July in a 2–2 draw against Morocco at Hampden Park, Glasgow.

He made his senior debut for Honduras in a September 2011 friendly match against Paraguay and represented his country in seven FIFA World Cup qualification matches, as well as playing at the 2013 Copa Centroamericana. He missed Honduras' 2014 FIFA World Cup attempt due to injury. At the time of his death, he had appeared 26 times for his country.

Death
Peralta died after being fatally shot outside a shopping mall in his hometown of La Ceiba on 10 December 2015, at the age of 26. He was hit by eighteen bullets, and police ruled out robbery as a motive.

Two days later, a minute of silence was observed at Ibrox before a Scottish Championship game between Rangers and Morton.

Career statistics

Club

International

Honours
Rangers
Scottish League One: 2013–14

References

External links
 
 Rangers F.C. profile

1989 births
2015 deaths
People from La Ceiba
Association football midfielders
Deaths by firearm in Honduras
Honduran footballers
Honduran expatriate footballers
Honduras international footballers
Olympic footballers of Honduras
Footballers at the 2012 Summer Olympics
2013 Copa Centroamericana players
C.D.S. Vida players
Rangers F.C. players
Expatriate footballers in Scotland
Liga Nacional de Fútbol Profesional de Honduras players
Scottish Professional Football League players
Male murder victims
Honduran expatriate sportspeople in Scotland
People murdered in Honduras
Honduran murder victims